Raymond II ( – 1190 at Acre) was the 9th Viscount of Turenne from the House of Comborn. He was a son of Viscount Boson II and Eustorgie d'Anduze, and grandson of Raymond I of Turenne.

Raymond was born posthumously four months after his father's death. Together with his cousin Aimar V of Limoges, he took part in several revolts against Duke Richard I. He joined the Third Crusade, in which he died during the Siege of Acre in 1190.

Raymond was married to Helie, a daughter of Bernard of Castelnau. She later became a nun at Obazine Abbey. Their children were:

Raymond III (died 1219), Viscount of Turenne
Boso
Contors, married Elijah of Comborn
Marie, married Viscount Eble V of Ventadorn (died around 1236)
Helie, married Bernard of Casnac

The troubadour Bertran de Born sang about his three daughters.

References

1143 births
1190 deaths
Christians of the Third Crusade
People killed in action
Viscounts of Turenne